Tonnerre Deux Zeus  (formerly known as Tonnerre de Zeus, commonly stylized as Tonnerre 2 Zeus)  is a wooden roller coaster located at Parc Astérix in Plailly, France. Opened in 1997 and built by Custom Coasters International, it is currently the 2nd longest wooden coaster in Europe, after Colossos. Between 2019 and 2022, the coaster underwent a three year renovation from The Gravity Group, eventually re-emerging as the Tonnerre 2 Zeus in 2022.

"Tonnerre de Zeus" is French for "Thunder of Zeus." In Greek mythology, Zeus was regarded as the king of gods. He also is often associated as being a weather god, hurling a thunderbolt at those who displeased him.

A large statue of Zeus is featured at the entrance to the ride's queue line, which extends through a neighboring wooded areas, then follows the ride's final helix and the brake run before heading towards the station itself: a massive Greek temple allowing for a quick passenger load and unload.

History
The original Tonnerre de Zeus opened in April 1997 as the second wooden roller coaster built in France after Walygator Parc's Anaconda, and the park's second large-scale coaster after Goudurix in 1989. No other wooden coasters were built in France until Walibi Rhône-Alpes – also owned by Parc Astérix operator Compagnie des Alpes – debuted Timber in 2016. Built by the Gravity Group, Timber was built at a cost of €4.2 million and was well-received by the public.

In 2019, the park began a three-phase renovation project on the coaster in which 85% of the track and structure would be replaced. In conduction with the Gravity Group, Phase's 1 and 2 took place during the 2018-19 and 2019-20 park offseason's, respectively. The third and final phase was originally planned to take place in the autumn of 2020, but was put on hold for a year due to the COVID-19 pandemic.

Tonnerre 2 Zeus was officially announced by Parc Astérix on June 24, 2021, which would revitalize the coaster's image and conclude the renovations. The lead car of the new Timberliner trains was unveiled at the IAAPA Expo Europe in Barcelona on September 28, 2021. Tonnerre de Zeus officially held its last day of operation prior to the final stage of its transformation on November 7. The new Timberliners were delivered in late March of 2022, and Tonnerre 2 Zeus held its grand re-opening on April 9.

Ride Experience
Following a turnaround, the coaster proceeds into a signature 90-degree banked airtime hill. A speed bump underneath the lift hill sends the train through a banked turnaround and then through a series of straight hills spanning the coaster site, before being greeted by yet another lower-ground turnaround. Crossing the layout yet again, riders navigate a left-hand turnaround into a darkened tunnel with smoke and strobe effects. A few more banked airtime moments lead to a final 270° counterclockwise helix, thus sending the train into the brake run. One ride on Tonnerre de Zeus lasts about 2 minutes and 5 seconds.

Characteristics

Statistics
Much of the original structure was built out of American Yellow Pine.

Trains
When Tonnerre de Zeus originally opened, it ran with two blue trains from Philadelphia Toboggan Coasters, each of which consisted of seven cars that sat riders in two rows of two for a total of 28 passengers per train. Another pair of trains – red and blue – purchased for the 2004 season, although the latter was repainted blue in 2014. Following the 2021-22 offseason renovation, Tonnerre 2 Zeus currently runs with a pair of Timberliner trains from Gravitykraft, each consisting of 13 single row cars that seat a pair of riders across for a total of 26 riders per train. A third train is kept to the side as a spare. The final row on each train faces backwards, and can be accessed at an €8 extra cost.

References

Wooden roller coasters
Roller coasters in France
Roller coasters introduced in 1997